Peter Baláž (born 1974-06-13 in Žilina) is a retired male boxer from Slovakia, who competed for his native country at the 1996 Summer Olympics in Atlanta, Georgia. There he was stopped in the first round of the men's light flyweight division (– 48 kg) by Indonesia's La Paene Masara. He starred as himself in the 2015 Slovak film Goat.

References

External links
 sports-reference

1974 births
Living people
Slovak male film actors
Flyweight boxers
Boxers at the 1996 Summer Olympics
Olympic boxers of Slovakia
Sportspeople from Žilina
Slovak male boxers